Lyapis Trubetskoy was a Belarusian rock band. It was named after comical hero from Ilya Ilf's and Yevgeny Petrov's novel "The Twelve Chairs", poet and potboiler Nikifor Lyapis, who used pseudonym Trubetskoy.

On 17 March 2014 frontman Siarhei Mikhalok announced that the band would be dissolved, on 31 August the band ceased to exist and broke up in two ensembles: Brutto and Trubetskoy.

History

Popularity in the 2000s 

In January 2009 their album Manifest became "the best album of the year 2008" according to the West Records top-list and The Lenta music review. In August 2009 they played as headliners at the “Be Free” festival organized by the European Radio for Belarus in Chernihiv (Ukraine) together with Vopli Vidopliassova, Hair Peace Salon, and more Belarusian and Ukrainian rock bands. Lyapis Trubetskoy was one of the bands that performed (in December 2013) for Euromaidan-protesters in Kyiv, Ukraine.

Dissolution
Frontman Siarhei Mikhalok announced mid-March 2014 that the group would cease to exist the next 1 September. The groups farewell concert was given in the Valeriy Lobanovskyi Dynamo Stadium in Kyiv, Ukraine on 26 August. Mayor of Kyiv Vitali Klitschko was present at this concert.

Former band members led by Pavel Bulatnikaw formed a new band Trubetskoy Minsk. Siarhei Mikhalok founded the band Brutto.

Albums

Videography 
 2014 – Warriors of Light (Воины Света)
 2014 – Matryoshka (Матрёшка)
 2013 – Tank (Танк)
 2013 — Dance (Танцуй)
 2013 — Lyapis Crew
 2012 — Iron (Железный)
 2012 — Armored vehicle (Броненосец)
 2012 — WaysofPeople (Путинарода, also could be translated as In kind of Putin)
 2011 — Not To Be Cattle! (Не быць скотам!)
 2011 — Princess (Принцесса)
 2011 — Astronauts (Космонавты)
 2011 — I believe (second version, Я верю)
 2011 — I believe (Я верю)
 2010 — Africa (Африка)
 2010 — Bolt (Болт)
 2010 — Buy Belarusian (Купляй беларускае)
 2010 — Pulse of epoch (Пульс эпохи)
 2009 — Fireflies (Светлячки)
 2009 — Petrel (Буревестник)
 2009 — Belarus Freedom
 2009 — The Lights (Огоньки)
 2008 — Manifesto (Манифест)
 2008 — Zhlob (Жлоб)
 2008 — Kerch-2 (Керчь-2)
 2008 — Golden Antelope (Золотая Антилопа)
 2007 — Capital (animated version, Капитал)
 2007 — Capital (garage version, Капитал)
 2006 — Reindeers (by TIK, Олені)
 2006 — No More (Харе)
 2006 — Sayani (Саяны)
 2006 — Andryusha (Андрюша)
 2004 — Ten O'Clock Postman (Почтальоны)
 2004 — Golden Eggs (Золотые яйцы)
 2003 — Rainka (Раинька)
 2003 — Swallows (Ласточки)
 2002 — Gop-Hip-Hop, КДБ микс (feat. Sasha and Sirozha, Гоп-хип-хоп)
 2002 — Youth (Юность)
 2001 — Nonbeauty (Некрасавица)
 2001 — Sochi (Сочи)
 2001 — Love turned its back on me (feat. KARAPUZIKEE, Любовь повернулась ко мне задом)
 2001 — Doves (Голуби)
 2000 — In The Alleys (feat. MASKY-SHOW, По аллеям)
 2000 — UFO (НЛО)
 2000 — Sports have passed (Спорт прошел)
 2000 — Pal (Version 2 – master, Дружбан)
 2000 — Pal (Version 1 – backwards, Дружбан)
 1999 — Appletrees (Яблони)
 1999 — Rose (Розочка)
 1999 — You gave me up (feat. Diskoteka Avariya, Кинула)
 1998 — You Gave me Up (Кинула)
 1998 — In a white dress (В платье белом)
 1997 — Ah-oo (Ау)

References

External links

Lyapis Trubetskoy website 
Official MySpace
Lyapis Trubetskoy fan-club website, tons of rare photos, videos and audios 
Lyrics, with English translations on RussMus.Net
Lyapis Trubetskoy's Music Video for "Ogon'ki (The Lights)"
Lyapis Trubetskoy's Music Video for "Capital" + interview with director Aliaksei Tserakhau
New album «Manifest» available for free download and music video «Жлоб» (Zhlob)

Belarusian punk rock groups
Russian-language singers
Ukrainian-language singers
English-language singers from Belarus
Polish-language singers
Comedy musical groups
Ska groups
Belarusian alternative rock groups
Musical groups established in 1990
Musical groups disestablished in 2014
People of the Euromaidan